HMS Garry was a Yarrow-type River-class destroyer of the Royal Navy built under the 1903 – 1904 Naval Estimates.  Named after the River Garry in north central Scotland, she was the first ship to carry this name in the Royal Navy.

Construction
She was ordered under the 1903 – 1904 Naval Estimates, laid down on 25 November 1904 at the Yarrow shipyard at Poplar and launched on 21 March 1905. She was completed in September 1905.  Her original armament was to be the same as the turtleback torpedo boat destroyers that preceded her. In 1906 the Admiralty decided to upgrade the armament by landing the five 6-pounder naval guns and shipping three 12-pounder 8 hundredweight (cwt) guns. Two would be mounted abeam at the foc's'le break and the third gun would be mounted on the quarterdeck.

Pre-war
After commissioning she was assigned to the East Coast Destroyer Flotilla of the 1st Fleet and based at Harwich.

On 26 July 1907, Garry and the destroyer  collided off Sandown, damaging both ships.

In April 1909, she was assigned to the 3rd Destroyer Flotilla on its formation at Harwich. She remained until displaced by a Beagle-class destroyer by May 1912. She was assigned to the 5th Destroyer Flotilla of the Second Fleet with a nucleus crew.

On 30 August 1912 the Admiralty directed all destroyer classes were to be designated by alpha characters starting with the letter 'A'.  The ships of the River class were assigned to the E class. After 30 September 1913, she was known as an E class destroyer and had the letter 'E' painted on the hull below the bridge area and on either the fore or aft funnel.

First World War
The 9th Flotilla was a patrol flotilla tasked with anti-submarine and counter-mining patrols in the Firth of Forth area. Here she provided anti-submarine and counter mining patrols in defence of the main fleet anchorage.

On 23 November 1914, the German submarine  was attempting to enter Scapa Flow when it was spotted in Pentland Firth and was rammed by the naval trawler Dorothy Grey. In an attempt to escape U-18 dived, struck bottom forcing her back to the surface. Garry then rammed U-18 which sank at position  with the loss of one person and 22 survivors becoming prisoners of war.

In August 1915, with the amalgamation of the 7th and 9th Flotillas, she was assigned to the 1st Destroyer Flotilla when it was redeployed to Portsmouth in November 1916. She was equipped with depth charges for employment in anti-submarine patrols, escorting of merchant ships and defending the Dover Barrage. In the spring of 1917 as the convoy system was being introduced the 1st Flotilla was employed in convoy escort duties for the English Channel for the remainder of the war.

Damaged by the depth-charge attack, the U-boat surfaced and was rammed by Garry at position . According to a British account, UB-110 sank with the loss of 13 of her men. There were 15 survivors. According to a German account, all but the two radio operators were able to escape from the sinking U-boat, but the survivors were subsequently attacked while in the water with the result that only 13 of the crew of 34 survived. The wreck was raised by the Royal Navy in October 1918. Lt Cdr Lightoller was awarded a bar to his DSC for this action.

Disposition
She was placed on the disposal list. On 22 October 1920, she was sold to J. H. Lee for breaking up.

She was not awarded a battle honour for her service.

Pennant Numbers

References

Bibliography
 
 
 
 
 
 
 

 

River-class destroyers
1905 ships
Ships built in Poplar
World War I destroyers of the United Kingdom